Sir Graham Stuart Brady (born 20 May 1967) is a British politician serving as the Member of Parliament (MP) for Altrincham and Sale West since 1997. A member of the Conservative Party, he has been Chairman of the 1922 Committee since 2010, except for a brief period in 2019. During his tenure as 1922 Committee chairman, he has overseen the election of three Conservative Party leaders and Prime Ministers (Theresa May, Liz Truss and Rishi Sunak) as well as votes of no confidence into May and Boris Johnson.

Brady served as a Shadow Minister under four Conservative leaders before resigning in 2007 in protest at David Cameron's opposition to grammar schools.  On 1 December 2010, Brady was voted "Backbencher of the Year" by The Spectator at its annual parliamentary awards.

On 7 March 2023, he announced that he would not seek re-election at the next general election.

Early life
Brady was born on 20 May 1967 in Salford, Lancashire, England. He was educated at the Altrincham Grammar School for Boys. He read Law at the University of Durham, and graduated with a Bachelor of Arts (BA) degree in 1989.

Brady was highly active in politics as a student. He served as Chairman of the Durham University Conservative Association (DUCA) for the 1987–1988 academic year and was one of six students elected to represent Durham at the annual NUS conference. He served additionally as Chairman of Northern Area Conservative Students (1987–1989) and as a member of the Conservative Party's National Union Executive Committee (1988–1989).

Early career
Brady was appointed a consultant in public relations with Shandwick plc in 1989. He joined the Centre for Policy Studies in 1990. He was appointed director of public affairs at the Waterfront Partnership in 1992, where he remained until he was elected to the House of Commons in 1997. He was vice-chairman of the East Berkshire Conservative Association from 1993 to 1995.

Parliamentary career
He was selected to contest the Altrincham and Sale West parliamentary constituency, following the retirement of the veteran Conservative MP Fergus Montgomery. Brady's constituency is considered to be a Conservative safe seat, having returned only Conservative MPs during its existence. The 1997 general election proved to be a close battle in the seat, but Brady was elected with a majority of 1,505 votes. He was the youngest Conservative MP to be elected in 1997, having been elected just before his 30th birthday, the next youngest being Tim Collins who was three years older than Brady. In the party leadership election that followed his election, Brady supported Michael Howard. 

Brady made his maiden speech in the House of Commons on 2 June 1997. From 1997 to 2001 he was a member of the Education and Employment Select Committee and its Employment Sub-Committee. He was joint secretary of the Conservative Party Committee for Education and Employment from 1997 to 2000.

In 1998 he made enquiries to John Bourn, at the time Comptroller and Auditor General, on his decision not to publish a National Audit Office report on the controversial Al-Yamamah arms deal. The same year, Brady was one of only 13 Conservative MPs who voted in favour of an equal age of consent. He was a member of the executive of the 1922 Committee from 1998 to 2000.

He became a member of the Education and Employment Select committee, and Parliamentary Private Secretary (PPS) to the Chairman of the Conservative Party, Michael Ancram in 1999. He was made an Opposition Whip by William Hague in 2000. In February 2000, Brady complained about anti-grammar school literature circulated to parents in Altrincham by Michael Evans, then head of Trinity Church of England High School, arguing that this violated rules about public funds being used for campaign material – a complaint subsequently upheld by Secretary of State for Education David Blunkett. That same year Brady would become an opposition spokesman on Education and Employment.

Brady was vice-chair of the all-party Advertising Group, secretary of the all-party Cayman Islands Group and treasurer of the all-party Egypt Group from 2001. Following a second Conservative defeat at the 2001 general election, Brady continued as an opposition spokesman on Education and Skills under the leadership of both Hague and Iain Duncan Smith. He became the PPS to the Leader of the Opposition, Michael Howard, in 2003, and an opposition spokesman on foreign affairs and Shadow Europe Minister in 2004. From 2004 to 2005 he was a member of the Office of the Deputy Prime Minister Select Committee and its Urban Affairs Sub-Committee. He was vice-chair of the all-party Montserrat Group from 2006. He became a member of the Treasury Select Committee and rejoined the executive of the 1922 Committee in 2007.

On 29 May 2007, Brady resigned his post as Shadow Minister for Europe in protest at Conservative leader David Cameron's opposition to grammar schools. He told the BBC that "faced with a choice between a front bench position that I have loved and doing what I believe to be right for my constituents and for the many hundreds of thousands of families who are ill-served by state education in this country, there is in conscience only one option open to me", and argued that "grammar schools in selective areas are exactly the motor that does drive social mobility more effectively than comprehensive areas". Brady's own constituency has retained a selective rather than comprehensive education system.

Brady was secretary of the all-party Fluoridation Group and Infrastructure Group from 2008. From 2009 he was treasurer of the all-party Thailand Group and vice-chair of the Cannabis and Children Group. 

In 2013, he opposed the Marriage (Same Sex Couples) Act 2013, raising concerns that the measure had not been in the Conservative manifesto and that religious freedom could be compromised.

In the 2016 EU referendum, he was a supporter of Brexit.

In July 2018, it was reported that Brady served as editor of The House, the in-house Parliamentary magazine, earning a salary of £26,000 for the role.

1922 Committee 

Brady succeeded Sir Michael Spicer as Chairman of the 1922 Committee on 26 May 2010. 

The Committee, sometimes known as "The 1922" for short, is the parliamentary group of the Conservative Party and has a central role in the election of the Leader of the Conservative Party. Since 2010 Brady has overseen the election of 3 Conservative Leaders (Theresa May in 2016, Liz Truss in 2022 and Rishi Sunak in 2022) all of whom have become the Prime Minister since the Conservative Party has been in office throughout his tenure as Chairman. 

He resigned as 1922 Committee chairman on 24 May 2019 in order to explore launching a bid to become leader of the Conservative Party in the weeks that followed, but ultimately opted not to run for Leader. His Deputy Chairmen Cheryl Gillan and Charles Walker oversaw the 2019 leadership contest which resulted in the election of Boris Johnson.

Brady temporarily returned to the 1922 Committee on 3 September 2019, to serve as its acting Chairman "until a new executive is elected in the next session of Parliament". He was subsequently re-elected as the permanent Chair on 20 January 2020.

Brady's role as Chairman of the 1922 has given him a high public profile, as it falls to him to announce the results of each leadership election or challenge, and this is often followed on live TV and streaming around the world.

In 2022, Brady became the longest-ever serving Chairman of the 1922 Committee, surpassing Edward du Cann.

Legislation

Brexit: anti-Northern Ireland backstop amendment 

On 29 January 2019, the House of Commons voted 317 to 301 to approve Brady's amendment to the Brexit Next Steps motion, which called for "the Northern Ireland backstop to be replaced with alternative arrangements to avoid a hard border, supports leaving the European Union with a deal and would therefore support the Withdrawal Agreement subject to this change".

COVID-19 lockdowns 
In May 2020, Brady called for the removal of "arbitrary rules and limitations on freedom" brought in by the government because of the COVID-19 pandemic. He said that the British public had been "a little too willing to stay at home". Speaking out against a second lockdown, he also spoke about COVID-related mental health issues, such as increased rates of suicide and domestic abuse, as well as excess deaths caused due to reduced access for care. Brady is also a steering committee member of the lockdown-sceptic COVID Recovery Group, a group of Conservative MPs who oppose the UK government's December 2020 lockdown. They were seen as an "echo" of the Brexiteer European Research Group (ERG) of MPs, and a response by backbench Conservatives to Nigel Farage's anti-lockdown Reform UK party.

Personal life
Brady met Victoria Lowther at Durham University. The couple married in 1992, and have a daughter and a son. He employs his wife Victoria as his senior parliamentary assistant. Brady was reported to be among those MPs who paid the highest amount to family members that they employ, with a range between £40,000 and £45,000 disclosed.

He currently resides in Altrincham in Greater Manchester.

Knighthood
Brady was appointed a Knight Bachelor "for political and public service" in the 2018 New Year Honours. His investiture by the Duke of Cambridge took place at Buckingham Palace on 6 March 2018.

References

Notes

External links
 Graham Brady MP official site
 
 ePolitix.com - Graham Brady MP 
 Guardian Unlimited Politics - Ask Aristotle: Graham Brady MP
 BBC News - Graham Brady  profile 30 March 2006
 

1967 births
Chairmen of the 1922 Committee
Conservative Party (UK) MPs for English constituencies
UK MPs 1997–2001
UK MPs 2001–2005
UK MPs 2005–2010
UK MPs 2010–2015
UK MPs 2015–2017
UK MPs 2017–2019
UK MPs 2019–present
People educated at Altrincham Grammar School for Boys
Alumni of St Aidan's College, Durham
People from Salford
Living people
Knights Bachelor
Politicians awarded knighthoods
British Eurosceptics